Clinidium smithsonianum is a species of ground beetle in the subfamily Rhysodinae. It was described by R.T. Bell & J.R. Bell in 1985. Clinidium smithsonianum is known from Dominica (Lesser Antilles). It measures  in length.

References

Clinidium
Beetles described in 1985
Beetles of North America
Endemic fauna of Dominica